Trinity Episcopal Church is an Episcopal church located in Columbus, Georgia.

History
The church was founded in 1834 and was the fifth Episcopal church in the state of Georgia. The first church building was completed in 1837. The current building was built in 1890-91 and formally consecrated in 1892.

See also
 National Register of Historic Places listings in Muscogee County, Georgia
 Episcopal Diocese of Georgia

References

External links

 Official Website of Trinity Episcopal Church
 The History of Columbus, Georgia

Episcopal Church (United States)
Episcopal church buildings in Georgia (U.S. state)
Churches in Columbus, Georgia
Columbus metropolitan area, Georgia
Gothic Revival church buildings in Georgia (U.S. state)
Religious organizations established in 1834
1834 establishments in Georgia (U.S. state)